Francis Barnard (6 May 1902 – 4 April 1996) was an English cricketer. He played twenty-three first-class matches for Oxford University Cricket Club between 1922 and 1924. He was born in Saint Lucia; by 1934, he had returned there and was captain of the Saint Lucian tennis team. He was honorary vice-consul of Norway in Saint Lucia and was appointed a Chevalier of the Order of St Olav in 1955.

See also
 List of Oxford University Cricket Club players

References

External links
 

1902 births
1996 deaths
English cricketers
Oxford University cricketers
Alumni of Brasenose College, Oxford
Order of Saint Olav